Solariella anarensis is a species of sea snail, a marine gastropod mollusk in the family Solariellidae.

Distribution
This species occurs in antarctic and subantarctic waters.

References

External links
 Atlas of Living Australia: Solariella anarensis

anarensis
Gastropods described in 1972